The 1973–74 FC Bayern Munich season was the club's ninth season in Bundesliga.

Review and events
Udo Lattek led Bayern to their fourth German championship and won the European Cup final against Atlético Madrid 4–0 after a replay.

Match results

Legend

Bundesliga

DFB-Pokal

European Cup

References

FC Bayern Munich seasons
Bayern
UEFA Champions League-winning seasons
German football championship-winning seasons